Giuseppe Gamba (25 April 1857 – 26 December 1929) was an Italian Cardinal of the Roman Catholic Church and an archbishop of Turin.

Biography

Early life and ministry
Giuseppe Gamba was born in Asti, Italy and was educated at the local Seminary of Asti. He was ordained on 18 September 1880 and did pastoral work and served as the vicar general of the diocese of Asti from 1883 until 1901.

Episcopate
He was appointed as Bishop of Biella on 16 December 1901 by Pope Leo XIII. He was transferred to the see of Novara on 13 August 1906, where he remained until he was promoted to the metropolitan see of Turin on 20 December 1923.

Cardinalate
He was created Cardinal-Priest of Santa Maria sopra Minerva by Pope Pius XI in the consistory of 20 December 1926. He died in 1929 after being a cardinal for only three years.

See also

References

1857 births
1929 deaths
20th-century Italian cardinals
Bishops of Biella
Bishops of Novara
Archbishops of Turin
20th-century Italian Roman Catholic archbishops
People from San Damiano d'Asti